In enzymology, a NADPH dehydrogenase is an enzyme that catalyzes the chemical reaction

NADPH + H+ + acceptor  NADP+ + reduced acceptor

The 3 substrates of this enzyme are NADPH, H+, and acceptor, whereas its two products are NADP+ and reduced acceptor.

This enzyme belongs to the family of oxidoreductases, specifically those acting on NADH or NADPH with other acceptors. It has 2 cofactors: FAD,  and FMN.

Nomenclature 

The systematic name of this enzyme class is NADPH:acceptor oxidoreductase. Other names in common use include

 NADPH2 diaphorase
 NADPH diaphorase
 old yellow enzyme
 diaphorase
 dihydronicotinamide adenine dinucleotide phosphate dehydrogenase
 NADPH-dehydrogenase
 NADPH-diaphorase
 NADPH2-dehydrogenase
 old yellow enzyme
 reduced nicotinamide adenine dinucleotide phosphate dehydrogenase
 TPNH dehydrogenase
 TPNH-diaphorase
 triphosphopyridine diaphorase
 triphosphopyridine nucleotide diaphorase
 NADPH2 dehydrogenase
 NADPH:(acceptor) oxidoreductase.

References

Further reading 

 
 

EC 1.6.99
NADPH-dependent enzymes
Flavoproteins
Enzymes of known structure